The Mack M123 (G792) was a 10-ton 6x6 semi-tractor introduced in 1955; the Mack M125 was a heavy cargo truck version of the M123. The M123 was used to tow tank transporter trailers while the M125 towed field artillery pieces.

History 
In 1949 the US Army set a requirement for a family of extra heavy-duty 10‑ton (9,072 kg) off-road load rated 6x6 tactical trucks. Mack's design, influenced by their WWII era NO, was chosen. Designed as an entire family, only the semi-tractor and cargo/prime mover were built. 392 M123s were built between 1955 and 1957 and 552 M125s in 1957 and 1958.

In 1965 CONDEC began building 3188 diesel powered M123As, Mack began building 420 in 1968. In 1969 Mack then upgraded 210 gas engine models to diesel power.

With the Army using more self‑propelled artillery, the need for prime movers was reduced, no follow‑up orders for M125s were made.

Both M123s and M125s saw service in the Vietnam War. M123 tractors remained in Army service into the 1990s.

In addition to the US Army, the M123 was used by the U.S. Marine Corps and exported to U.S. allies in such countries as Australia and Spain.

Specifications

Engine and driveline 
All M123s and M125 built in the 1950s had a LeRoi T‑H844 engine, a 
M123A1s built in the 1960s had a Cummins V8‑300, a  naturally aspirated V8 diesel engine developing  at 3000 rpm and  torque at 2100 rpm. This engine was also retrofitted into M123s to make M123E2s. No M125s were converted to diesel power.

The drivetrain was a repeat of that in the Mack NO, with a Mack TRDXT72 5 speed transmission with the transfer case mounted solidly to the rear of the transmission. This transmission was direct in 5th. The transfer case had a 2.50:1 low range, engaged the front axle, and had a power take-off to operate the winch(es).

The front axle was an unusual triple reduction type which did not need universal joints on the outer ends and allowed a tighter turning radius. The two rear axles were a double reduction type. Final drive ratios were 9.02:1 for gas powered trucks and 10.11:1 for diesels. The driveline for every M123 and M125 was built by Mack, regardless of who manufactured the rest of the truck.

Chassis 
A ladder frame was used. The front beam axle was mounted on leaf springs, the rear tandem beam axles were mounted on a leaf sprung "walking beam" type suspension. All models shared a  wheelbase (measured from 1st to 3rd axles). Full air drum brakes were used, M123s were able to control the trailer brakes independently of the tractor. M125s had electrical connections for the artillery piece brakes. Tire size was 14.00x24.

The main differences between various chassis was the location of the  winches and fifth-wheels. Different M123 models had either one or two winches mounted behind the cab, all M125s had a single winch at the front.

The M15A2 trailer the M123 was first intended to tow had a higher load plate and larger coupling pin than a standard semi-trailer. Early M123s had a larger fifth wheel mounted above the frame rails, but as more standard trailers were used the M123C and all following models had lowered fifth wheels. The pin remained larger, so any trailer towed by any M123 had to have an interchangeable pin.

It had hinged doors with roll-up windows, a folding windshield, and a removable canvas roof. A hard roof could be fitted. With the same cabs and similar design fenders and hoods, the main visual difference between these three sizes was the size of the vehicle and the scale of the cab to the vehicle.

Models

M123 

The M123 was used to tow semi-trailers carrying MBT's (in conjunction with the M15A1 and later the M747 semi-trailer) and as such superseded the M26(A1) Pacific "Dragon Wagon" and semi-trailers carrying engineering equipment (e.g. in conjunction with the M 127 low bed semi-trailer).

Variants:
 M123 had dual winches and high mounted fifth wheel, gasoline engine
 M123C had a single mid-ship winch and low mounted fifth wheel, gasoline engine
 M123D had dual mid-ship winches and low mounted fifth wheel, gasoline engine
 M123A1 had a single rear winch and a V‑8 diesel engine.
 M123A1C, built from 1965 to 1969 by CONDEC, had a diesel engine and single rear winch
 M123E1 were M123's that were upgraded with the diesel engine.
 M123E2 with dual rear winches, diesel engine

M125 
The M125 succeeded the Mack NO as a heavy cargo transport vehicle; it also served as a prime mover towing the 155‑mm gun and 8‑in. howitzer. The chassis was designated M121. It had a  steel cargo body with folding troop seats, bows and canvas cover. A single front-mounted Garwood DSA716  capacity winch was fitted, and a chain hoist at rear for handling ammunition.

Gallery

See also

List of U.S. military vehicles by model number
List of supply catalog G-numbers
Mack EH
Mack NM Truck, 6-Ton, 6x6, Cargo
Mack Trucks

Notes

References
 
 
 
 
 
 
 
 
 
 
 
ORD 7 SNL G-792 (31 January 1958) Section I, LeRoi engine parts.
TM 9-8002 (1 November 1955)
TM 9-8003-1 (25 June 1956) Ordnance Maint. for Engine, Accessories and Clutch
TM 9-2320-206-ESC (ESC stands for Equipment Serviceability Criteria)
Jane's Military Vehicles and Ground Support Equipment 1984, pages 486 and 465 (M125), 
Articles on M123 and M125 on Olive Drab (http://olive-drab.com/idphoto/id_photos_m125.php)

Military trucks of the United States
M123 M125
Six-wheeled vehicles
Military vehicles introduced in the 1950s